Thomas Richard Suozzi (born August 31, 1962) is an American politician, attorney and accountant who served as the U.S. representative for  from 2017 to 2023. His district included part of the North Shore of Long Island.

A member of the Democratic Party, Suozzi was the county executive of Nassau County, New York from 2002 to 2009. He was first elected to the post in 2001 after four two-year terms as mayor of Glen Cove. In 2006, he ran unsuccessfully against Eliot Spitzer for the Democratic nomination for governor of New York, on a "Fix Albany" platform. Suozzi was elected to the House of Representatives in 2016 and reelected in 2018 and 2020. He retired from Congress to run again for the Democratic nomination for governor of New York in 2022, losing to incumbent Governor Kathy Hochul.

Early and personal life
The son of former Glen Cove mayor Joseph A. Suozzi, Thomas Suozzi was born on August 31, 1962 in Glen Cove. His father was born in Italy and his mother, Marguerite, is of Irish and English descent. The youngest of five siblings, Tom Suozzi attended Catholic schools, graduating from Chaminade High School, Boston College, and Fordham University School of Law. He is trained as both a lawyer and a CPA.

Early political career

Mayor of Glen Cove
In 1993, Suozzi was elected mayor of Glen Cove, New York. He served as mayor for four terms. His father and his uncle, Vincent Suozzi, were mayors of Glen Cove before him.

As mayor, Suozzi focused on environmental cleanup of commercial and industrial sites. A focal point of his administration was redeveloping brownfield and superfund sites. In 1994, the Glen Cove incinerator was permanently closed and dismantled. In 1998, the city demolished and redeveloped the defunct Li Tungsten Refinery grounds, a federal superfund site. Then-Vice President Al Gore recognized Suozzi for the city's environmental cleanup efforts and Glen Cove was awarded the Brownfields Award in 1998.

Nassau County Executive

Suozzi was elected Nassau County Executive in 2001, becoming the first Democrat elected to the position in traditionally Republican Nassau in 30 years. He assumed office amid a fiscal crisis. By 1999, Nassau was on the brink of financial collapse: the county faced a $300 million annual deficit, was billions of dollars in debt, and its credit rating had sunk to one level above junk status. According to The New York Times, he "earned high marks from independent institutions for his signature achievement, the resuscitation of Nassau's finances."

While in office, Suozzi cut spending and reduced borrowing and debt. He also oversaw 11 county bond upgrades over two years, eliminated deficits in Nassau, and accumulated surpluses. In 2005, Governing Magazine named Suozzi one of its Public Officials of the Year, calling him "the man who spearheaded Nassau County, New York's, remarkable turnaround from the brink of fiscal disaster." According to The New York Times, Suozzi garnered praise for social services like his "no wrong door" program, which centralized access to social services.

Suozzi lost the 2009 county executive election to Ed Mangano. After working in the private sector as an attorney, he announced that he would seek a rematch against Mangano in 2013. He attacked Mangano for "presiding over a decline in the county" while also emphasizing that, while he was county executive, Suozzi had eight years of balanced budgets and reduced crime. In November, Mangano defeated Suozzi, 59% to 41%.

2006 New York gubernatorial campaign

Suozzi declared his candidacy for governor of New York in the Democratic primary against Eliot Spitzer on February 25, 2006. The bid appeared from the start to be something of a long shot given Spitzer's reputation as a "corporate crusader", though Suozzi often pointed out that he prevailed as a long shot before when he first ran for Nassau County Executive.

Few prominent Democrats apart from Nassau County Democratic Party Chairman Jay Jacobs supported his bid; most of New York's Democratic legislators and mayors campaigned for Spitzer. One of Suozzi's biggest supporters was Victor Rodriguez, founder of the now disbanded Voter Rights Party. Rodriguez eventually became the lead field organizer for Suozzi's Albany campaign office. The campaign was funded in part by Home Depot co-founder Kenneth Langone, former NYSE CEO Richard Grasso, David Mack of the MTA, and many people on Wall Street whom Spitzer had investigated and prosecuted.

On June 13, 2006, Suozzi spoke before the New York State Conference of Mayors along with Spitzer and John Faso. Suozzi received a standing ovation from the crowd of mayors. On July 6, Suozzi announced to his followers that he had collected enough petitions to place himself on the primary ballot. During a debate, he said he had presidential aspirations. On August 7, after much speculation, Suozzi announced that he would not seek an independent line were he to lose the primary.

2022 New York gubernatorial campaign 

On November 29, 2021, Suozzi announced his candidacy for governor of New York in the 2022 election. He lost the Democratic primary to incumbent governor Kathy Hochul.

U.S. House of Representatives

Elections

2016 

In June 2016, Suozzi won a five-way Democratic primary in New York's 3rd congressional district. He was endorsed by The New York Times, Newsday, and The Island Now. He defeated Republican State Senator Jack Martins in the general election on November 8, and began representing New York's 3rd congressional district in the 115th United States Congress in January 2017.

2018 

In June 2018, Suozzi won the Democratic primary unopposed. In the general election, Suozzi defeated Republican nominee Dan DeBono, a future Trump administration Chief Infrastructure Funding Officer and former trader and investment banker, by 18 points.

2020 

In June 2020, Suozzi won a three-way Democratic primary in New York's 3rd congressional district with 66.5% of the votes. In the general election, he defeated Republican nominee George Santos by over 12 points.

Tenure 

As of November 2021, Suozzi had voted in line with Joe Biden's stated position 100% of the time.
  		  	
He is vice-chair of the Bipartisan Problem Solvers Caucus, which comprises 22 Democrats and 22 Republicans. He also co-chairs the Long Island Sound Caucus, co-chairs the Quiet Skies Caucus, and chairs the United States Merchant Marine Academy’s Board of Visitors. Suozzi is a member of the Congressional Asian Pacific American Caucus, the United States Congressional International Conservation Caucus  the Climate Solutions Caucus, is a Commissioner on the Congressional Executive Commission on China, and is the Chairman of the Congressional Uyghur Caucus.

In Congress, Suozzi authored legislation to restore the State and Local Tax (SALT) Deduction, which was capped at $10,000 in 2017. Through his work, Suozzi orchestrated a call from the New York Congressional Delegation for the repeal of the SALT cap.

In 2021 it was reported that while in congress, Suozzi failed to file the required reports on approximately 300 different stock transactions according to a complaint from the nonpartisan Campaign Legal Center. In 2022 it was reported Suozzi failed to properly disclose another 31 stock transactions worth as much as $885,000.

In 2022, Suozzi strongly opposed a proposal by Governor Kathy Hochul to permit homeowners to add an accessory dwelling unit (such as an extra apartment and backyard cottage) on lots zoned for single-family housing. The proposal was intended to alleviate New York's housing shortage and make housing more affordable. Suozzi said that he supported efforts to tackle housing problems, but that he was against "ending single-family housing".

Committee assignments

 Committee on Ways and Means

Caucus memberships

 Congressional Asian Pacific American Caucus 
 United States Congressional International Conservation Caucus 
 Climate Solutions Caucus
 Problem Solvers Caucus (vice chair)
 Long Island Sound Caucus
 Quiet Skies Caucus (co-chair)
 United States Merchant Marine Academy’s Board of Visitors (Chair)
New Democrat Coalition
Congressional Uyghur Caucus (chair)

Electoral history

Personal life
Suozzi and his wife, Helene, have three children. Their son Joe played baseball at Boston College and is in the minor-league system of the New York Mets.

Suozzi is Roman Catholic.

See also
 New York gubernatorial election, 2006

References

External links

 
 
 

|-

|-

|-

1962 births
20th-century American politicians
21st-century American politicians
American people of English descent
American people of Irish descent
American people of Italian descent
American Roman Catholics
Boston College alumni
Catholics from New York (state)
Chaminade High School alumni
Democratic Party members of the United States House of Representatives from New York (state)
Fordham University School of Law alumni
Living people
Mayors of places in New York (state)
Nassau County Executives
Politicians from Glen Cove, New York